Federico van Ditmar (born 16 December 1969) is an Argentine alpine skier. He competed at the 1988, 1992 and the 1994 Winter Olympics.

References

1969 births
Living people
Argentine male alpine skiers
Olympic alpine skiers of Argentina
Alpine skiers at the 1988 Winter Olympics
Alpine skiers at the 1992 Winter Olympics
Alpine skiers at the 1994 Winter Olympics
Sportspeople from Bariloche